Potier is a surname, meaning potter, and may refer to;

 Alfred Potier (1840–1905), French polymath
 Benoît Potier (born 1957), French businessman
 Charles Potier (1806–1870), French actor and playwright
 Dominique Potier (born 1954), French politician
 Edgard Potier (1903–1944), Belgian military officer
 Jérôme Potier (b.1962), French former tennis player.
 Joseph Potier (1768—1830), French privateer
 Pierre Potier (1934–2006), French pharmacist
 Pierre-Philippe Potier (1708–1781), Belgian Jesuit priest and lexicographer.
 Suki Potier (1947–1981), English model

See also
 Pottier
 Potter (name)
 House of Potier

Surnames
Surnames of French origin
French-language surnames